The 1996 Cork Junior A Football Championship was the 98th staging of the Cork Junior A Football Championship since its establishment by Cork County Board in 1895. The draw for the opening round fixtures took place on 10 December 1995. The championship ran from 29 September to 10 November 1996.

The final was played on 10 November 1996 at Páirc Uí Rinn in Cork, between Kilshannig and Youghal, in what was their first ever meeting in the final. Kilshannig won the match by 1–07 to 0–05 to claim their second championship title overall and a first title since 1985.

Dan O'Brien and Jimmy Dennehy were the championship's joint-top scorers

Qualification

Results

Quarter-finals

Semi-finals

Final

Championship statistics

Top scorers

Overall

In a single game

Miscellaneous

 A delay in the completion of the divisional championships resulted in Deel Rovers and Youghal being nominated to represent Avondhu and Imokilly respectively. Deel Rovers had actually qualified for the county final but were beaten by Kilshannig in the North Cork final, who then took their place in the championship. After being beaten in the final, Youghal were later beaten by Fr. O'Neill's in the East Cork final.

References

1996 in Irish sport
Cork Junior Football Championship